is a passenger railway station located in the city of Takasago, Hyōgo Prefecture, Japan, operated by the private Sanyo Electric Railway.

Lines

Station layout
The station consists of two island platforms connected by an underground passage.

Platforms

Adjacent stations

|-
!colspan=5|Sanyo Electric Railway

History
It was renamed  in February 1924 and to its present name on April 7, 1991.

Passenger statistics
In fiscal 2018, the station was used by an average of 3241 passengers daily (boarding passengers only).

Surrounding area
 Umegaedayu 
 Takasago Chamber of Commerce and Industry 
 Mitsubishi Paper Mills Takasago Factory

See also
List of railway stations in Japan

References

External links

 Official website (Sanyo Electric Railway) 

Railway stations in Japan opened in 1923
Railway stations in Hyōgo Prefecture
Takasago, Hyōgo